Aghia Thallassini was a Hansa A Type cargo ship which was built as Brünhilde in 1943 by  C. Van der Giessen & Zonen's Scheepswerfen NV, Krimpen aan den IJssel, Netherlands for Hamburg-Südamerikanische Dampfschifffahrts-Gesellschaft, Hamburg, Germany. She was seized as a prize of war in 1945, passing to the Ministry of War Transport and renamed Empire Game. She was sold in 1947 and was renamed Canford. Sold to West Germany in 1956, she was rebuilt and renamed Fangturm.  She was sold to  the Lebanon in 1961 and was renamed Panaghia Lourion. She was sold in 1967 to Greece and was renamed Aghia Thassalini. Sold to Cyprus in 1970, she served until 1973, when she was scrapped.

Description

The ship was propelled by a compound steam engine. The engine was built by werkspoor, Amsterdam, Netherlands.

The ship had a complement of 37. She was equipped with 1×30-tonne, 1×10-tonne and 10×5-tonne cranes.

History
Brünhilde was a Hansa A Type cargo ship built in 1943 as yard number 726 by C. Van der Giessen & Zonen's Scheepswerfen NV, Krimpen aan den IJssel, Netherlands for Hamburg-Südamerikanische Dampfschifffahrts-Gesellschaft, Hamburg, Germany. Her keel was laid on 17 April, She was launched on 20 October and completed on 31 May 1944. Her port of registry was Hamburg, and the Code Letters DKKS were allocated.

On 18 March 1945, Brünhilde was severely damaged by the explosion of two mines off Warnemünde. In May 1945, Brünhilde was seized as a prize of war at Kiel, Germany. The Code Letters GTJN were allocated. Her port of registry was London and she was operated under the management of Mundus Export & Shipping Co. Ltd. In December 1946, the Ministry of Transport offered Empire Game for sale.

On 5 March 1947, Empire Game  was sold to Mundus Export & Shipping Co. Ltd. and was renamed Canford.

On 16 March 1956, Canford was sold to Partenreederei D. "Fangturm"Bremen, West Germany, which was 95% owned by Bohlen & Behn, Hamburg and 5% owned by the Deutsche Dampfschifffarts-Gesellschaft Hansa, Hamburg. She was rebuilt and renamed Fangturm. Her port of registry was Bremen and the Code Letters DLCG were allocated. In May 1959, she was sold to Deutsche Dampfschifffarts-Gesellschaft Hansa.

on 23 November 1961, Fangturm was sold to Rio Pardo Naviera SA, Beirut, Lebanon and was renamed Panaghia Lourion. The Code Letterf ODHH were allocated. With their introduction in the 1960s, Panaghia Lourion was allocated the IMO Number 5269522.

In 1967, Panaghia Lourion was sold to Tamara Compagnia Naviera, Piraeus, Greece and was renamed Aghia Thalassini. The Code Letters SXMI were allocated. She was sold in 1970 to Aldebaran Shipping Co., Famagusta, Cyprus. The Code Letters 5BMX were allocated. She arrived at Perama, Greece on 15 June 1973 for scrapping by I. Katimertzoglou. Aghia Thalassini was scrapped in May 1974.

References

External links
Monochrome photograph of Fangturm.

1943 ships
Ships built in the Netherlands
World War II merchant ships of Germany
Steamships of Germany
Maritime incidents in March 1945
Empire ships
Ministry of War Transport ships
Merchant ships of the United Kingdom
Steamships of the United Kingdom
Merchant ships of West Germany
Steamships of West Germany
Merchant ships of Lebanon
Steamships of Lebanon
Cargo ships of Greece
Steamships of Greece
Merchant ships of Cyprus
Steamships of Cyprus